Katrina Nimmers (born May 30, 1980) is an American former professional tennis player.

Nimmers, an African American, grew up in South Los Angeles. She reached a best singles world ranking of 377 on the professional tour and won one doubles title on the ITF Women's Circuit. Her only WTA Tour singles main draw appearance came at the 2001 Bank of the West Classic in Stanford, where she lost in the first round to Cara Black.

ITF finals

Doubles: 1 (1–0)

References

External links
 
 

1980 births
Living people
American female tennis players
African-American female tennis players
Tennis players from Los Angeles